Jackie Cassello is an American gymnast.

Gymnastic career
Cassello left home at the age of 11 to live with gymnastic coaches Margie and Gregor Weiss. In 1979, at age thirteen, she won a gymnastics gold medal in the Pan American Games.

Original "Supersister"
In 1979, the Supersisters trading card set was produced and distributed; one of the cards featured Cassello's name and picture.

References

Living people
American female artistic gymnasts
Year of birth missing (living people)
Pan American Games medalists in gymnastics
Pan American Games gold medalists for the United States
Pan American Games silver medalists for the United States
Gymnasts at the 1979 Pan American Games
Medalists at the 1979 Pan American Games
21st-century American women